The Bell XP-83 (later redesignated ZXF-83) was a United States prototype jet escort fighter designed by Bell Aircraft during World War II. It first flew in 1945. As with most early first generation jet fighters, the design was hampered by a relative lack of power. With the rapid advancements in jet technology post-WWII, the XP-83 was soon eclipsed by more advanced designs and it never entered production.

Design and development
The early jet fighters consumed fuel at a prodigious rate which severely limited their range and endurance. In March 1944, the United States Army Air Forces requested Bell to design a fighter with increased endurance and formally awarded a contract for two prototypes on 31 July 1944.

Bell had been working on its "Model 40" interceptor design since 1943. It was redesigned as a long-range escort fighter while retaining the general layout of the P-59 Airacomet. The two General Electric J33-GE-5 turbojet engines were located in each wing root which left the large and bulky fuselage free for fuel tanks and armament. The fuselage was an all-metal semimonocoque capable of carrying 1,150 gal (4,350 L) of fuel. In addition, two 250 gal (950 L) drop tanks could be carried. The cabin was pressurized and used a small and low bubble style canopy. The armament was to be six 0.5 in (12.7 mm) machine guns in the nose.

Testing
Early wind tunnel reports had pinpointed directional instability but the "fix" of a larger tail would not be ready in time for flight testing. 

The first prototype was flown on 25 February 1945, by Bell's chief test pilot, Jack Woolams. He found it to have satisfactory flight characteristics, although it was under-powered. The expected instability was confirmed – spins were avoided (until a larger tail fin was installed). The second prototype did incorporate a modified tail and an aileron boost system. One unusual characteristic was extremely high landing speeds, due to factors including the XP-83's lack of drag brakes – in addition to the sleek aerodynamics and relatively high minimum thrust settings common to early jet aircraft, and necessary to prevent unintended flame-outs. This meant that test pilots were forced to fly "stabilized approaches" (i.e. very long and flat landing approaches).

The first prototype was used in 1946 as a ramjet test-bed with an engineer's station located in the fuselage behind the pilot. On 14 September 1946, one of the ramjets caught fire forcing pilot, "Slick" Goodlin and engineer Charles Fay, to bail out. The second prototype flew on 19 October and was later scrapped in 1947. Apart from range, the XP-83 was inferior to the Lockheed P-80 Shooting Star and this led to the cancellation of the XP-83 project in 1947.

Specifications (XP-83)

See also

References

Notes

Bibliography
 Carpenter, David M. Flame Powered: The Bell XP-59A Airacomet and the General Electric I-A Engine. Boston: Jet Pioneers of America, 1982. . (Page 59 is about the XP-83.)
 Green, William. War Planes of the Second World War: Fighters, Volume Four. London: Macdonald, 1961 (6th impression 1969). . 
 Green, William and Gordon Swanborough. WW2 Aircraft Fact Files: US Army Air Force Fighters, Part 1. London: Macdonald and Jane's Publishers Ltd., 1977. .
 Knaack, Marcelle Size. Encyclopedia of US Air Force Aircraft and Missile Systems: Volume 1 Post-World War II Fighters 1945-1973. Washington, DC: Office of Air Force History, 1978. .
 Koehnen, Richard C. "Bell's No Name Fighter." Airpower, Vol. 12, no. 1. January 1982.
 Pelletier, Alain J. Bell Aircraft Since 1935. Annapolis, MD: Naval Institute Press, 1992. .

External links

 Joe Baugher's XP-83 page
 USAF Museum page
 
 
 Warbirds Resource Group page, with photos

P-083
Bell P-83
Twinjets
Cancelled military aircraft projects of the United States
Aircraft first flown in 1945
World War II jet aircraft of the United States
Mid-wing aircraft